Thomas Delaine (born 24 March 1992) is a French professional footballer who plays as a defender for French club Strasbourg in the Ligue 1.

Club career
Delaine spent years in the lower divisions of France and considered quitting football for a career in gardening, before signing his first professional contract with Paris FC in the Ligue 2. Delaine made his professional debut with Paris FC in a Ligue 2 0–0 tie with Clermont Foot on 28 July 2017.

On 25 May 2022, Delaine signed a three-year deal with Strasbourg.

References

External links
 
 
 

1992 births
Living people
Association football defenders
French footballers
Paris FC players
FC Metz players
RC Strasbourg Alsace players
Ligue 1 players
Ligue 2 players
Championnat National 3 players
People from Lens, Pas-de-Calais
Sportspeople from Pas-de-Calais
Footballers from Hauts-de-France